Cartier Field was a stadium in Notre Dame, Indiana, first dedicated on May 11, 1900, as an arena for football, baseball, track and field, and bicycling. It hosted the University of Notre Dame Fighting Irish football team from 1900 to 1928 and held nearly 30,000 people at its peak.  The stands were torn down after the 1928 season  to make room for Notre Dame Stadium, which opened in 1930.  Notre Dame played its entire 1929 schedule away from campus ("home" games were at Chicago's Soldier Field), went undefeated (9–0) and won the National Championship. At Coach Knute Rockne's insistence, Cartier Field's grass was transplanted into Notre Dame Stadium.

For more than 30 years after the football team moved out, Cartier Field remained the home of Notre Dame's baseball and track and field teams. In 1962, the original Cartier Field was replaced by a quadrangle adjoining the Memorial Library, which opened in 1963, and a new facility named Cartier Field was opened east of Notre Dame Stadium.  Since 2008, the Notre Dame Fighting Irish football team has held outdoor practices at the LaBar Football Practice Fields and indoor practices at Meyo Field in the Loftus Center until 2019. Since 2019, the team has moved indoor practices to the newly constructed Irish Athletic Center.

It was named after Warren Antoine Cartier, an 1887 civil engineering graduate and former member of the football team who purchased  and donated it to the university for establishment of the field. He also paid for furnishing the lumber required to enclose the field with fencing and construct a grandstand.

The Irish entertained many notable people on the athletic field by allowing them kicking drills or other activities.  Babe Ruth visited the field in 1926, and Jack Dempsey underwent kicking drills in 1936.

The Fighting Irish would officially amass a 117–2–6 record at Cartier Field (with an additional three to five wins and one loss coming in the 1899 season before the field was dedicated) with their two losses coming against Wabash in 1905, and Carnegie Tech in 1928, which happened to be the last match football game played on the field.  During this 29-year stretch, the Irish also recorded some of the longest home winning streaks in the history of college football, with 40 consecutive wins from 1907 to 1918, and 38 consecutive wins from 1919 to 1927 (if not for a tie against Great Lakes Navy in 1918, the streak would have been 79 consecutive contests).  In terms of unbeaten streaks, the Irish were undefeated at home for 23 years and 93 contests, from 1905 to 1928.

List of games

References

External links
 History of Cartier Field

Defunct college football venues
Defunct college baseball venues in the United States
American football venues in Indiana
Notre Dame Fighting Irish football venues
Notre Dame Fighting Irish baseball venues
University of Notre Dame buildings and structures